This is a list of Swedish television related events from 2003.

Events
20 April - Anders Johansson wins the second season of Fame Factory.
11 May - Danne Sörensen wins season 3 of Big Brother Sverige, becoming the show's first male winner.

Debuts

Television shows
1-24 December - Håkan Bråkan

2000s
Big Brother Sverige (2000-2004, 2011-2012)
Fame Factory (2002-2005)

Ending this year

Births

Deaths

See also
2003 in Sweden

References